Sintran (a portmanteau of SINTEF and Fortran; stylized as SINTRAN) is a range of operating systems (OS) for Norsk Data's line of minicomputers. The original version of Sintran, was written in the programming language Fortran, released in 1968, and developed by the Department of Engineering Cybernetics at the Norwegian Institute of Technology together with the affiliated research institute, SINTEF. The different incarnations of the OS shared only name, and to a degree, purpose.

Norsk Data took part in developing Sintran II, a multi-user software system that constituted the software platform for the Nord-1 range of terminal servers. By far the most common version of the OS was Sintran III, developed solely by Norsk Data and launched in 1974. This real-time multitasking system was used for Norsk Data's server machines (such as the Nord-10, -100) for the remainder of the company's lifetime, i.e. until 1992.

See also
Sintran III

Fortran software
Proprietary operating systems
Norsk Data software